Ana Ardıç (literally “main juniper”) is a monumental tree in Turkey which is included in the list of natural monuments of Turkey.

Administratively, it is in Çamlıyayla ilçe (district) of Mersin Province.

As of 2015 the tree was 1107 years old.
On 29 September 1994 the tree was declared a natural monument.

References

Individual trees in Turkey
Natural monuments of Turkey
Mersin Province
Çamlıyayla District